Mirko Albertazzi (born 28 June 1997) is an Italian football player. He plays for Picerno.

Club career
He made his Serie C debut for Virtus Francavilla on 4 September 2016 in a game against Catanzaro.

On 18 August 2020, he signed a 2-year contract with Picerno. However, Picerno was relegated into Serie D due to irregularities, their appeal against the decision was denied, and the contract was cancelled.

On 20 October 2020, he joined Entella in Serie B.

On 7 August 2021 he returned to Picerno, now back to Serie C.

References

External links
 

1997 births
Footballers from Bologna
Living people
Italian footballers
Association football goalkeepers
Bologna F.C. 1909 players
Virtus Francavilla Calcio players
L.R. Vicenza players
Virtus Entella players
AZ Picerno players
Serie C players